Nevia is a genus of sea snails, marine gastropod mollusks in the family Cancellariidae, the nutmeg snails.

Species
Species within the genus Nevia include:

 Nevia spirata (Lamarck, 1822)

References

External links
 

Cancellariidae
Monotypic gastropod genera
Taxa named by Félix Pierre Jousseaume